Doxocopa is a genus of Neotropical butterflies in the family Nymphalidae, subfamily Apaturinae. It includes the following species:

 Doxocopa agathina (Cramer, [1777]) - Agathina emperor
 Doxocopa burmeisteri (Godman & Salvin, [1884])
 Doxocopa callianira (Ménétriés, 1855)
 Doxocopa clothilda (C. Felder & R. Felder, [1867])
 Doxocopa cyane (Latreille, [1813])
 Doxocopa elis (C. Felder & R. Felder, 1861)
 Doxocopa excelsa (Gillott, 1927)
 Doxocopa kallina (Staudinger, 1886)
 Doxocopa lavinia (Butler, 1866)
 Doxocopa laure (Drury, [1773]) - silver emperor
 Doxocopa laurentia (Godart, [1824])
 Doxocopa linda (C. Felder & R. Felder, 1862) - Linda emperor
 Doxocopa pavon (Latreille, [1809]) - Pavon emperor
 Doxocopa plesaurina (Butler & H. Druce, 1872)
 Doxocopa seraphina (Hübner, [1825])
 Doxocopa zalmunna (Butler, 1869)
 Doxocopa zunilda (Godart, [1824])

Gallery

See also
Adelpha - a genus of butterflies which closely resemble the females of most species of Doxocopa

References

Apaturinae
Nymphalidae of South America
Taxa named by Jacob Hübner
Nymphalidae genera